The Higher Institute for Applied Sciences and Technology (HIAST) is center of Excellence for Higher Education, Research & Development in  Damascus, Syria. It belongs to the Syrian Scientific Studies and Research Center (SSRC).

Information
HIAST was established in 1983 with the aim to qualify personnel to conduct scientific and technological research in all applied sciences and technology fields, so they can participate in the scientific and economic process in Syria. HIAST provides opportunities to make progress in applied research fields by joining courses to be awarded the degree of engineering Diploma, Master and Doctorate.

HIAST is the academic interface for the military Syrian Scientific Studies and Research Center (SSRC). 
HIAST extends the scientific applications which it conducts in cooperation with several public and private bodies in Syria, and also executes joint projects at the regional and international levels to transfer technology and exchange experience.

HIAST awards the Engineering Diplomas (5 years undergraduate) in one of the following specialties:
 Telecommunication engineering.
 Electronic Systems engineering.
 Mechatronic engineering.
 Informatics engineering.
 Material engineering.
 Aeronautics engineering (Aleppo).

HIAST also offers seven Masters programs (2 years postgraduate, “by-research” academic masters):
 Communication Systems.
 Control and Robotics.
 Informatics and Decision Support Systems.
 Big Data Systems.
 Optical Science and Engineering.
 Materials Science and Engineering.

In addition, HIAST also awards PhD degrees in communications, informatics, control systems and in materials science and engineering.

In addition to undergraduate and postgraduate programs at HIAST, continuous research and development activities are undertaken by HIAST engineers and researchers working in different departments, laboratories and technology centers. Some of these R&D activities are undertaken in collaboration with national and international universities, research centers & organizations.

Its main campus is in the Hameesh area of the Barzeh municipality of Damascus, and a second location in Aleppo.

Ranking  
HIAST has been established in 1983 to be the top academic institute in Syria. It has been ranked as the top academic institution in Syria since its establishment except for few years. 

In 2017, HIAST was ranked 1st in Syria and 4327th in world ranking.

Notable alumni 
 Imad Abdel Ghani Sabouni - Minister of Communications 2007-2014
 Yomen Atassi, Renowned researcher in Material sciences and nanotechnology.
 Omran Kouba,  mathematician - former director of HIAST (2002-2004), former director of the National center for curriculum development,(2014-2015).
 Nidal Chamoun - theoretical physicist

References

External links 
 HIAST website
 HIAST official Facebook page

HIAST
Education in Damascus
Buildings and structures in Damascus
Research institutes in Syria
Educational institutions established in 1983
1983 establishments in Syria